Live in the UK is the first live album by House of Lords, released on 29 January 2007.

The album was recorded during the band's last tour with the original reunited line up in 2005, on 26 November 2005 in Nottingham, England. It is the band's last recording with the original line-up (excluding keyboardist and founding member Gregg Giuffria who had no part in the 2000 reunion).

Track listing

Personnel
James Christian – lead vocals
Lanny Cordola – guitar
Chuck Wright – bass, backing vocals
Ken Mary – drums, percussion

External links
[ Billboard.com]

Culture in Nottingham
Frontiers Records live albums
House of Lords (band) albums
2007 live albums